Silvio Borsetti (born 24 March 1888, date of death unknown) was an Italian racing cyclist. He rode in the 1921 Tour de France.

References

External links
 

1888 births
Year of death missing
Italian male cyclists
Place of birth missing